Impious is a Swedish thrash/death metal band.

History

Swedish thrash/death metal band Impious was formed by Valle Adzic and Martin Åkesson in April 1994. The band had some difficulties finding a permanent drummer, so a friend of theirs, Johan, filled in as a session drummer. Shortly after that, Robin Sörqvist joined the band on bass. Impious recorded their debut demo in the summer of 1995, called Infernal Predomination.

Shortly after the recording session, drummer Johan had to quit the band due to lack of time, since he had to do military service. Finding a permanent drummer turned out to be harder than they expected. No drummer was found, so another friend, Marko, filled in, also just as a session drummer. In May 1996 the band recorded their second demo, titled The Suffering, at Los Angered Recording with Andy La Rocque.

Shortly after the recording, a permanent drummer was finally found. Ulf Johansson accepted the job and this was the first time the band had a complete lineup. In the summer of 1997, Impious recorded their third demo called Promo '97. This demo never got to be released. At the same recording session, the band covered the Sepultura song, "Inner Self" for the tribute album Sepulchral Feast. Promo '97 resulted in a record deal with Swedish label Black Sun Records, and in December 1997, Impious recorded their debut album, Evilized, in Sunlight Studios with producer Tomas Skogsberg. The album was released in the summer of 1998. In October 1998, the band entered Los Angered Recording once again, but this time to cover the Metallica song, "One" for the tribute album Metal Militia III.

In January 2000, the band recorded their second album in Studio Mega with engineer Chris Silver. Unfortunately, it took almost a year for Black Sun to release the album. In the summer of 2000, Impious decided to make drastic line-up changes. Martin, who had always sang and played the guitar, quit playing the guitar to concentrate on vocals. Robin switched from bass to lead guitar. There was now no bass player, so Erik Peterson was asked to join the band, and he accepted.

In March 2001, Impious recorded a four-song promo in Studio Mega. The promo was sent to different labels with the intention to get a new deal. Impious then decided to sign a deal with Hammerheart Records.

In February 2002, drummer Ulf Johansson left the band, just five weeks before the recording of the new album. Impious hired in Mikael Norén, and in a few weeks he had learned all 10 songs for the new album. In March 2002, the band recorded their third album, The Killer, once again at Studio Mega with Chris Silver. Also an MCD was recorded later that year, including "The Deathsquad" from the album The Killer, plus a re-recorded version of "Extreme Pestilence" from Evilized, plus three covers from Metallica, Running Wild and Mötley Crüe, along with two songs from their "Promo 2001". This MCD was released in January 2003 when the band went on a European tour together with Necrophobic and Satariel.

In February 2004, Impious paid respect to death metal pioneers Possessed, by appearing on the tribute album Seven Gates of Horror together with bands as Cannibal Corpse, Sadistic Intent, Vader, Sinister, Angel Corpse and Amon Amarth. Also in February 2004, Impious signed a worldwide deal with Metal Blade Records.

During the time between May and July, Impious recorded their fourth album Hellucinate at Studio Mega, except all vocals and solos which were recorded at Valle Adzic's own Deadline Studio.

Line-up
Valle Adzic – guitar
Martin Åkesson – vocals
Robin Sörqvist – lead guitar
Mikael Norén – drums
Erik Peterson – bass

Discography
 Infernal Predomination (Demo) – 1995
 Let There Be Darkness (Demo) – 1995
 The Suffering – 1996
 Evilized – 1998
 Terror Succeeds – 2000
 The Killer – 2002
 The Deathsquad EP – 2002
 Hellucinate – 2004
 Born To Suffer (Compilation) – 2004
 Holy Murder Masquerade – 2007
 Death Domination – 2009

External links

Official MySpace page

Swedish death metal musical groups
Swedish thrash metal musical groups
Musical groups established in 1994
1994 establishments in Sweden